The Big Tip Off is a 1955 American crime drama film directed by Frank McDonald and starring Richard Conte.

Summary
Richard Conte plays two-bit newspaper columnist Johnny Denton, who gains notoriety by printing tips on upcoming gangland activities.

Cast
Richard Conte as Johnny Denton 
Bruce Bennett as Bob Gilmore
Constance Smith as Penny Conroy

Production
It was known as Sweet Charity. Filming was to have 23 October 1954 but it was delayed until November. Another working title was Twilight Alley.

References

External links
The Big Tip Off at IMDb
The Big Tip Off at TCMDB
The Big Tip Off at BFI

1955 films
American crime drama films
1950s English-language films
Allied Artists films
1955 crime drama films
Films directed by Frank McDonald
1950s American films
American black-and-white films